Mill Creek is a stream in Morgan County in the U.S. state of Missouri. It is a tributary to the Gravois Creek arm of the Lake of the Ozarks.

Mill Creek was so named on account of watermills near its course.

See also
List of rivers of Missouri

References

Rivers of Morgan County, Missouri
Rivers of Missouri